Heads Up with Richard Herring or HUWRH, is a British celebrity chat show written by and starring Richard Herring, who is best known as one half of comedy duo Lee and Herring, the stars of BBC Two shows Fist of Fun and This Morning With Richard Not Judy. HUWRH featured professional poker players and celebrities talking about their lives, their careers and their love of poker. The title is a reference to poker terminology, meaning a game where only two players remain at the end of the game. Richard would interview each guest individually during the show.

The show was hosted in an evening chat show format in front of a studio audience. It was the first UK produced Poker chatshow. The regular structure features an opening monologue by Richard followed by interviews with three guests from the world of poker and entertainment.

This programme first aired in 2005 on the Sky Digital channel Pokerzone in the United Kingdom.

Episode Guests
 Episode 1: Chris Brooks (radio presenter)|, Malcolm "The Rock" Harwood, Ewen MacIntosh
 Episode 2: Andrew Black, James Hewitt, John Thomson
 Episode 3: Roberto Conte, Tiffany Williamson, Norman Pace
 Episode 4: Edward Giddins, Terry Frisby, John Duthie
 Episode 5: Andy Collins, Phil "The Power" Taylor, "Mad" Marty Wilson
 Episode 6: Grub Smith, Anthony Holden, Major Charles Ingram & Diana Ingram
 Episode 7: "Nasty" Nick Bateman, Greg "Fossilman" Raymer, John McCririck
 Episode 8: Fiona Foster, Dave "El Blondie" Colclough, Oliver Chris
 Episode 9: Addy Van Der Borgh, Brandon Block, "Barmy" Barny Boatman
 Episode 10: Jonathan Maitland, Roy "The Boy" Brindley, Michael Greco

Credits

Richard Herring – Written & Presented by
Derek Brandon – Director
Ray Addison – Series Producer
Yvonne Davies – Series Editor

External links
 www.pokerzone.tv
 www.richardherring.com

2005 British television series debuts
2006 British television series endings
2000s British television talk shows
British television talk shows
Television shows about poker
Poker in Europe